Craig Alexander P. Ross (born 29 January 1990) is an English footballer who plays for National League side Woking.

Career
Ross began his career in the academies at Southampton, Arsenal, Reading, Crystal Palace, Colchester United and Woking.

He then joined Ashford Town (Middlesex) in 2008, before joining Carshalton Athletic. Brief spells at Godalming Town and Welling United followed, before joining Hampton & Richmond Borough.

Ross joined Cambridge United in August 2012 as backup to Jonathan Hedge. During the season he was loaned to Eastbourne Borough, who he joined permanently for 2013–14.

He briefly joined Farnborough at the start of 2014–15, before joining Whitehawk. After two years with the Hawks, he joined Macclesfield Town for 2016–17. He joined Barnet on a one-year deal on 1 July 2017 after rejecting a new deal with the Silkmen. Ross made his debut for the Bees in the EFL Cup against Brighton & Hove Albion on 22 August 2017. He played 33 league games for the Bees that season but his contract was not renewed following their relegation.

He was released by Barnet at the end of the 2017–18 season.

Following a spell with Leatherhead, Ross returned to Woking in September 2018. On the same day of his arrival, he made his debut during a 2–2 draw against Torquay United. On 12 May 2019, Ross was part of the side that triumphed over Welling United in the National League South play-off final to secure promotion back to the National League at the first time of asking. On 12 April 2021, Ross signed a new two-year deal with the club.

Career statistics

Honours

Club
Woking
National League South play-offs: 2018–19

References

External links

1990 births
Living people
People from Walton-on-Thames
English footballers
Association football goalkeepers
Southampton F.C. players
Arsenal F.C. players
Reading F.C. players
Crystal Palace F.C. players
Colchester United F.C. players
Woking F.C. players
Ashford Town (Middlesex) F.C. players
Carshalton Athletic F.C. players
Godalming Town F.C. players
Welling United F.C. players
Hampton & Richmond Borough F.C. players
Cambridge United F.C. players
Eastbourne Borough F.C. players
Farnborough F.C. players
Whitehawk F.C. players
Macclesfield Town F.C. players
Barnet F.C. players
Leatherhead F.C. players
English Football League players
National League (English football) players
Isthmian League players
Footballers from Surrey